This is the list of the best-selling compilation albums in the UK each year.

Best-selling compilation albums

See also
List of UK Compilation Chart number ones

References

External links
Compilation Albums Top 40 at the Official Charts Company
The Official UK Compilation Chart at MTV
UK Top 40 Compilation Albums at the BBC Radio 1

Compilation albums by year in the United Kingdom
Best-selling compilation albums by year
Best